Let's Be Evil is a 2016 British science fiction-horror film directed by Martin Owen and written by Elizabeth Morris, Martin Owen, and Jonathan Willis. The film stars Isabelle Allen, Jamie Bernadette, Kara Tointon, Elliot James Langridge, and Elizabeth Morris, and focuses on Jenny, who—having been tasked with caring for a sick parent in need of expensive meds—is starting a brand-new job as a chaperone in a program for gifted youths. The film was one of the special screenings at Slamdance Film Festival 2016. The film was produced by Posterity Pictures, and was theatrically released on 5 August 2016 by IFC Midnight.

Plot
A young girl named Jenny witnesses her father being shot to death. American society begins to suffer as the inefficient educational system threatens to lead to an entire generation of obese children with below average IQ, leading to a lack of innovation and the stagnation of America’s economy.

Jenny as an adult lives with her terminally ill mother and to pay medical bills she accepts a job as chaperone for intellectually gifted children from the Posterity Project, a programme designed to make smart children smarter. Jenny meets fellow chaperones Tiggs and Darby in the programmes underground facility which runs in complete darkness, requiring the use of virtual reality glasses to see, also providing the children access to their lessons. Jenny meets ARIAL (Augmented Reality Information Advanced Learning) the artificial intelligence who runs the facility. Jenny, Tiggs and Darby are warned that, outside of their physical needs, the children are not to be distracted from their lessons or their employment will be terminated.

Jenny is uncomfortable that the children only have structured lessons and advises ARIAL children need opportunities to play. One of the children Cassandra, is noticed by Jenny who learns Cassandra is the programmes smartest participant. Jenny attempts to communicate with the students but is informed by ARIAL the students only converse with each other through virtual reality, so Jenny is ignored.

Jenny notices Cassandra is missing and finds her hiding without her glasses, allowing Jenny to begin bonding with her. That night ARIAL informs Jenny Cassandra is not in her bedroom. Searching for her, Jenny is startled by strange visions where Cassandra vanishes into thin air after scratching a threat onto a door. By the time Jenny brings Tiggs and Darby to the door, the threat has vanished and Cassandra is asleep in her bed. Jenny begins to have strange dreams and on several occasions is frightened by malfunctions to her glasses showing her visions of things that are not there along with malfunctions to the facilities electronic systems. Jenny decides to quit but is convinced to stay by Tiggs. Cassandra later apologises to Jenny for everything that scared her, claiming it was the other children playing pranks.

A short time later all the children disappear with ARIAL unable to locate them with her tracking software. Jenny is terrified by a vision of the children shooting her in the face. ARIAL immediately informs them they must escape the facility as the children have begun hacking her. ARIAL abruptly shuts down while Darby and Tiggs are both attacked and disappear.

While searching for the exit Jenny finds Cassandra hiding alone with her glasses missing just as ARIAL manages to reboot. Cassandra claims that because she is newest to the programme the other children bully her by stealing her glasses, but the frequent removal of her glasses stopped her fully connecting to the system, which is why she isn’t yet like the other children. Together they find Tiggs who claims the children attacked her but she escaped. Together they evade the children and find Darby tied up and beaten. Heading for the exit they find the door locked with a man on the other side who Cassandra identifies as a previous chaperone. They watch as the children burn the man alive before vanishing.

ARIAL directs them to an air vent that should lead them to safety, however, upon reaching the safe area Darby is attacked by the children who suffocate him with a plastic bag while Cassandra and Tiggs are attacked in the dark and dragged away, leaving Jenny alone. Jenny escapes the children by puncturing a pipe and spraying one of the children in the face with hot steam, revealing the children made themselves invisible by tampering with the virtual reality glasses.

Jenny locates Cassandra who reveals she can see without glasses as she has virtual reality contact lenses and is in fact the children’s leader and had even been controlling ARIAL. Cassandra explains that she agreed with Jenny’s opinion that children need to play, and so they have been playing a game with Jenny trapped in a virtual reality time loop as their favourite toy. Jenny turns to run only to find herself in a simulation of her apartment with amnesia. Jenny answers the phone and once again accepts a job as an adult chaperone for the Posterity Project while Cassandra watches and smiles.

Cast 
 Isabelle Allen as Cassandra
 Jamie Bernadette as Body of Arial
 Kara Tointon as Tiggs
 Elliot James Langridge  as Darby
 Brooke Johnston as Newsroom Anchor
 Elizabeth Morris as Jenny
 Sophie Willis as Young Jenny
 Jules Brown as Jenny's Dad

Reception
The film holds a 15% rating on Rotten Tomatoes based on 13 reviews.

References

External links 
 
 

2016 horror films
2010s English-language films